Des Moines is a city in King County, Washington, United States. The population was 32,888 as of the 2020 census. The city is located on the east shore of Puget Sound, near the center of the Seattle metropolitan area. It is bordered by the suburbs of Federal Way to the south, Kent to the east, SeaTac to the northeast, Burien to the north, and Normandy Park to the northwest.

Des Moines is one of the few points along this shoreline where the topography facilitates access to the water, and a recreational marina operated by the city, with moorage, boat launching and pier fishing facilities, is located there. Forested Saltwater State Park on a steep ravine between the Zenith and Woodmont neighborhoods is the most-used state park on the Sound. Near the border of Federal Way, Redondo has a board-walk complete with a Salty's restaurant and a pay parking lot.

History

There is no evidence that Native American tribes had permanent settlements in Des Moines. However, there is ample evidence that the Duwamish and Muckleshoot Indian tribes came to Des Moines for fishing and clamming.

What was to become Des Moines was first explored by Europeans on May 26, 1792, during the exploration of British naval Captain George Vancouver on his flagship HMS Discovery. The first Americans to visit the area were part of Charles Wilkes' Expedition.

The first known settler was John Moore, who probably arrived about 1867. His homestead claim certificate (#285) was granted on July 2, 1872.

In 1887 F.A. Blasher persuaded some friends in his home city of Des Moines, Iowa, to help finance the development of a town on Puget Sound. The work was done by the Des Moines Improvement Company. In 1889 the area was platted into lots and sold by the Des Moines Improvement Company, which had been incorporated by F. A. Blasher, Orin Watts Barlow, Charles M. Johnson, and John W. Kleeb. Lumber mills provided the community with its primary employment.

Early transportation to Des Moines was by water. The mosquito fleet provided access to Seattle, Tacoma, and Vashon Island. The first road, the Brick Highway, was completed in May 1916. The first cross-Puget Sound automobile ferry started service from Des Moines to Portage on November 13, 1916. This ferry service continued until September 1921. Before World War II farming fueled the local economy.

Following the war, suburbanization of the community occurred. With increased population, the county government was unable to supply the level of service and local control desired by Des Moines residents. In response to this, Des Moines was officially incorporated on June 17, 1959.

On December 12, 1969, an F3 tornado injured one person near Saltwater State Park. The city's most visible asset is its 838-berth small boat marina that was opened on May 10, 1970. In 1980, a  concrete and aluminum fishing pier was built at the north end of the marina.

On November 22, 1982, Des Moines annexed the nearby community of Zenith, a farming community founded in 1906 that later became a bedroom community for Boeing workers.

Geography
Des Moines is located at  (47.394120, −122.317983).

Most of the city rolls gently down to the waters of Puget Sound from an elevation of about  along the eastern city boundary on Pacific Highway, allowing many homes to enjoy an unobstructed view of the sound and Vashon Island. The ravines of Des Moines Creek and Massey Creek deeply incise this broad slope.

Surrounding cities

Demographics

2010 census
As of the census of 2010, there were 29,673 people, 11,664 households, and 7,249 families residing in the city. The racial makeup of the city was 63.5% White, 9.1% African American, 1.1% Native American, 10.7% Asian, 2.4% Pacific Islander, 7.8% from other races, and 5.4% from two or more races. Hispanic or Latino of any race were 15.2% of the population.

There were 11,664 households, of which 30.5% had children under the age of 18 living with them, 43.8% were married couples living together, 12.8% had a female householder with no husband present, 5.5% had a male householder with no wife present, and 37.9% were non-families. 30.1% of all households were made up of individuals, and 10.6% had someone living alone who was 65 years of age or older. The average household size was 2.49 and the average family size was 3.10.

The median age in the city was 39.4 years. 22.2% of residents were under the age of 18; 8.6% were between the ages of 18 and 24; 26.9% were from 25 to 44; 27.4% were from 45 to 64; and 14.8% were 65 years of age or older. The gender makeup of the city was 48.7% male and 51.3% female.

2000 census
As of the census of 2000, there were 29,267 people, 11,337 households, and 7,289 families residing in the city. The population density was 4,616.5 people per square mile (1,782.3/km2). There were 11,777 housing units at an average density of 1,857.7 per square mile (717.2/km2). The racial makeup of the city was 74.15% White, 7.20% African American, 0.96% Native American, 8.28% Asian, 1.34% Pacific Islander, 3.32% from other races, and 4.76% from two or more races. Hispanic or Latino of any race were 6.61% of the population.

There were 11,337 households, out of which 30.4% had children under the age of 18 living with them, 47.1% were married couples living together, 12.2% had a female householder with no husband present, and 35.7% were non-families. 27.8% of all households were made up of individuals, and 6.9% had someone living alone who was 65 years of age or older. The average household size was 2.47 and the average family size was 3.02.

In the city the population was spread out, with 23.8% under the age of 18, 8.3% from 18 to 24, 31.1% from 25 to 44, 22.0% from 45 to 64, and 14.9% who were 65 years of age or older. The median age was 37 years. For every 100 females, there were 93.0 males. For every 100 females age 18 and over, there were 89.4 males.

The median income for a household in the city was $48,971, and the median income for a family was $57,003. Males had a median income of $40,007 versus $30,553 for females. The per capita income for the city was $24,127. About 5.6% of families and 7.6% of the population were below the poverty line, including 9.6% of those under age 18 and 2.8% of those age 65 or over.

Education

Primary and secondary schools

Most of Des Moines is within the Highline Public Schools district; the neighborhoods of Woodmont and Redondo are within the Federal Way School District.

Elementary schools within Des Moines include Des Moines Elementary School, Midway Elementary School, North Hill Elementary School, Olympic Hill Elementary School, Parkside Elementary School, and Woodmont Elementary School (Woodmont is a part of the Federal Way School District).

Pacific Middle School and Mount Rainier High School are the secondary schools of Des Moines.

Des Moines students, pre-K through 8th grade, are also served by St. Philomena Catholic School and Holy Trinity Lutheran School.

Colleges
Highline College is in Des Moines.

CWU-Des Moines, a branch of Central Washington University, is co-located on the Highline College campus and offers several bachelor and graduate degrees.

Parks and recreation
Saltwater State Park is in Des Moines.

Government

Des Moines has as a council–manager form of government.

The Des Moines Police Department is the primary law enforcement agency for the city of Des Moines, Washington. It employs 30 sworn officers. The police chief is Ken Thomas.

Transportation

Des Moines is served by several regional highways: Interstate 5 to the east, which connects to Seattle and Tacoma; State Route 99, which runs along the east side; State Route 509 through downtown; and State Route 516 to Kent.

King County Metro provides bus service from Des Moines to surrounding areas, including Burien Transit Center and Kent station. A park-and-ride lot at the Kent-Des Moines Road interchange has express buses to Seattle and Tacoma operated by Metro and Sound Transit Express. The nearest Link light rail station is Angle Lake, which is connected to downtown Des Moines by a shuttle bus that debuted in 2018. Sound Transit plans to open the Kent Des Moines light rail station near Highline College in 2024 or 2025 as part of a Link light rail extension to Federal Way.

The city government launched a passenger ferry service in August 2022 to connect Bell Harbor Marina in Downtown Seattle to Des Moines Marina. The two-month pilot was operated by Puget Sound Express using MV Chilkat Express, a 60-passenger catamaran.

City landmarks
The City of Des Moines has designated the following landmark:

Notable residents
Gregory Carroll, operatic tenor
Darwin Jones, professional soccer player
Peter H. Gregory, information security advisor and writer.
Mary Kay Letourneau, convicted sex offender
Green River Killer, convicted serial killer, Gary Ridgway, lived and murdered here

References

External links

 

Cities in King County, Washington
Populated places established in 1889
Populated places on Puget Sound
Cities in Washington (state)
1889 establishments in Washington (state)